Platerodrilus is a genus of beetles of the family Lycidae. They commonly appear in the literature under the name Duliticola, which is an obsolete junior synonym. The females retain a larval form as adults (larviform females) and are about 40–80 mm in length.  The females and larvae have a flattened, dark body with large scales over the head, resembling trilobites, hence the informal names trilobite beetle, trilobite larva or Sumatran trilobite larva. In contrast, the males are much smaller, 8–9 mm, resembling other beetles. Species are found in tropical forests of India and South-east Asia.

Although the females resemble the prehistoric trilobite, the trilobite beetle evolved approximately 47 million years ago, 200 million years after trilobites had gone extinct. As only the females have this appearance the search for the species' male remained a mystery until Swedish zoologist Eric Mjoberg published a research paper describing them in 1925.

Species
 "P. paradoxus group"
 
 
 =
 "P. major group"
 
 
 
 "P. sinuatus group"
 
 
 
 
 
 
 
 
 
 
 
 Ungrouped
 
 =
 
 =
 
 = 
 
 
 
 =
 =

References

External links

Video of a trilobite beetle in Laos
Video of a trilobite beetle in Borneo

Lycidae
Elateroidea genera
Taxa named by Maurice Pic